Charanga-vallenata is a style of Latin music that combines conjunto, charanga and vallenato-style accordion. It is essentially Cumbia performed at double its normal speed. It could also be interpreted as Mambo with lyrics. It became popular in the 1970s, when it was associated with Roberto Torres.

References
 Descarga

20th-century music genres
Latin American music
Colombian styles of music